The China Touring Car Championship (CTCC) is a touring car racing series based in China. Between 2004 and 2008 the series was known as the China Circuit Championship. The series consists of two classes, one for 2000cc cars and one for 1600cc cars.

The series will join forces with the Japanese Touring Car Championship, which returns in 2012, with the series visiting each other during the 2012 season. The promoters of the two series are looking to form an Asian Touring Car Championship for Super 2000 cars in 2014.

Champions

References

External links
Official website 
Official website

Touring car racing series
Auto racing series in China
Recurring sporting events established in 2003
2003 establishments in China
Annual sporting events in China